Rodimiro Amaya Téllez (born 7 October 1954) is a Mexican politician affiliated with the Institutional Revolutionary Party (PRI). As of 2014 he served as Senator of the LVIII and LIX Legislatures of the Mexican Congress representing Baja California Sur. He also served as deputy during the LVI Legislature.

In 2000, after being elected in the Senate he resigned as member of the PRI to later affiliate to the Party of the Democratic Revolution (PRD), in 2005 he tried to be candidate for the governor of his state, but accused the then governor Leonel Cota Montaño to promote the candidature of his cousin Narciso Agúndez Montaño and resigned from the PRD.

References

1954 births
Living people
Politicians from Sonora
Members of the Senate of the Republic (Mexico)
Members of the Chamber of Deputies (Mexico)
Institutional Revolutionary Party politicians
Party of the Democratic Revolution politicians
21st-century Mexican politicians
People from Etchojoa Municipality